Mõdriku is a village in Vinni Parish, Lääne-Viru County, in northeastern Estonia.

Mõdriku Manor

Mõdriku Manor was first mentioned in 1470. Over the centuries, it has been the property of various Baltic German families. During the 20th century, it has been used by various schools. The building traces its oldest parts to the 17th century, but has been extensively enlarged and rebuilt both during the 1780s and 1890s.

The manor was the home of several successive generations of the von Kaulbars family, including Russian general and explorer Alexander von Kaulbars. His ancestor R. A. von Kaulbars, reputedly a great patriot, put up the column commemorating the French–Russian War of 1812 that is still visible in the manor park.

References

External links
Mõdriku manor at Estonian Manors Portal

Villages in Lääne-Viru County
Manor houses in Estonia